Austrogomphus arbustorum, also known as Austrogomphus (Austrogomphus) arbustorum, is a species of very small dragonfly of the family Gomphidae, 
commonly known as the toothed hunter. 
It inhabits rivers and pools in northern Queensland, Australia.

Austrogomphus arbustorum is a black and yellow dragonfly.

Gallery

See also
 List of Odonata species of Australia

References

Gomphidae
Odonata of Australia
Endemic fauna of Australia
Taxa named by Robert John Tillyard
Insects described in 1906